Schmidt Peninsula is a small peninsula connected by a low isthmus to Cape Legoupil, Trinity Peninsula.  Its western extremity is Bahamonde Point.

The peninsula was named by the Chilean Antarctic Expedition of 1947-48 for Captain Hugo Schmidt Prado, Chilean Army, the first commander of Base Bernardo O'Higgins established in 1948 on this peninsula.

Map
 Trinity Peninsula. Scale 1:250000 topographic map No. 5697. Institut für Angewandte Geodäsie and British Antarctic Survey, 1996.

Peninsulas of Graham Land
Landforms of Trinity Peninsula